Artyom Aregovich Avanesyan (born 17 July 1999) is an Armenian professional football player who plays for Armenian club FC Ararat-Armenia and the Armenia national football team.

International career
In August 2021, he was invited to represent the Armenia national football team. He made his debut on 5 September 2021 in a World Cup qualifier against Germany, a 0–6 away loss. He substituted Khoren Bayramyan in the 82nd minute.

References

External links
 
 

1999 births
People from Balashikha
Sportspeople from Moscow Oblast
Living people
Armenian footballers
Armenia international footballers
Russian footballers
Russian people of Armenian descent
Association football midfielders
FC Ararat Moscow players
FC Ararat-Armenia players
FC Pyunik players
Russian Second League players
Armenian Premier League players
PFC CSKA Moscow players